Monument to Nikola Tesla is a monument to the Serbian scientist Nikola Tesla, located in the capital of Azerbaijan, Baku, in a park at the crossing of the Azadlig Avenue and the Suleiman Rahimov Street. The monuments authors are the Peoples Artist of Azerbaijan, the sculptor Omar Eldarov and the architect Sanan Salamzade. The monument is cast from bronze. Its height together with the pedestal is 3.3 meters.

The monument is set against the background of a decorative panel depicting one of Teslas main inventions - an alternator. The opening ceremony of the monument took place on 8 February 2013. The ceremony was attended by the President of Azerbaijan, Ilham Aliyev, the First Lady of Azerbaijan, Mehriban Aliyeva, the President of Serbia, Tomislav Nikolic, and the First Lady of Serbia, Dragica Nikolic. At the opening ceremony, the presidents delivered speeches.

See also 
 Aliagha Vahid Monument
 Mustafa Kemal Atatürk Monument, Baku
 Wolfgang Amadeus Mozart monument, Baku

References

Nikola Tesla
Monuments and memorials in Baku
Sculptures by Omar Eldarov